Ringwood City Soccer Club is an Australian soccer club from Ringwood, a suburb of Melbourne. The club was formed in 1953 as Wilhelmina by Dutch Australians. The club currently competes in Victorian State League Division 4 East, where it has been since 2014.

History

Early History 
Wilhelmina D.S.C (Dutch Soccer Club) entered the Fourth Division Reserves competition in 1953, wearing all-orange kits and playing on a paddock in North Balwyn, its home for three years. The club finished second despite having begun halfway through the season. 1954 saw the first official Wilhelmina senior side enter the Fourth Division competition. The side had many players who had played in higher divisions and won the league with ease, earning promotion to Division Three. The following season, Wilhelmina earned promotion again with a perfect season of 18 consecutive wins. Wilhelmina relocated to Burnley Oval in Richmond in 1956. In 1956, the club won the Second Division and earned promotion to the first division. It took the club only four years to get promoted into the Victorian State League, losing only one game of the 54 played.

In 1957, Wilhelmina moved to McDonald Reserve in Hawthorn for its first season in the State League. The season ended with a fifth-place finish. The following season, Wilhelmina won the Dockerty Cup.

In 1966 they were relegated, but the following year they were again promoted as Ringwood City Wilhelmina. After many more years of an up-and-down State League campaign, they were relegated to Victorian State League Division 1 in 1990. This started the club's demise. After years of competition, the club found themselves relegated seven times, and found themselves in the lowest men's Victorian league, Metropolitan League South East.

Recent Years 
In 2009 Ringwood City defeated St. Kevins Old Boys 3–0 in the final round of the 2009 FFV Metropolitan South East division to gain their first championship in 12 years.

In 2013, Ringwood City won the State League Division 5 East championship, with Nicholas Theodore taking out the league Golden Boot, scoring 27 goals.

The club currently competes in Victorian State League Division 4 East, the sixth tier of Victoria football, where it has been since 2014.

Honours
Victorian State League Champions 1959
Victorian State League Runner-Up 1958
Victorian State League Division 1 Champions 1956, 1967
Victorian State League Division 2 Champions 1955, 1997
Victorian League Division 4 Champions 1954
Victorian State League Division 5 East Champions 2013
Victorian Metropolitan League SE Champions 2009
Dockerty Cup Winners 1958
State League Cup Winners 1961
AMPOL Pre Season Cup Winners 1962
B.I.S.C. Winners 2002

Competition timeline

References

 
Association football clubs established in 1953
Soccer clubs in Melbourne
1953 establishments in Australia
Sport in the City of Maroondah
Women's soccer clubs in Australia
Ringwood, Victoria